The Conservatives (K), previously known as the New Conservative Party (JKP) until 2022, is a liberal-conservative political party in Latvia.

It was formed on 17 May 2014. Jānis Bordāns was chosen as the leader on the founding assembly. The Conservatives is a conservative party, and it is positioned on the centre-right on the political spectrum. It has embraced its main appeal on anti-corruption policies. Due to its rapid transformation, it succeeded in winning seats in the 2017 municipal elections. In the 2018 parliamentary election they placed third by winning 16 seats.

Election results

Legislative elections

European Parliament

References

External links
Official website

Political parties in Latvia
Conservative parties in Latvia
Political parties established in 2014
2014 establishments in Latvia